Elixir Studios was a British video game developer. The company was founded in 1998 by Demis Hassabis, formerly a prominent figure at Lionhead Studios. At its height, it employed around sixty people, and was based in London. It aimed to be an independent developer, creating its own intellectual properties rather than licensing established ones. The company's first game, Republic: The Revolution, was released in 2003, and a second game, Evil Genius, was released in 2004.

In 2005, however, the company announced that it would be closing. This followed the cancellation of development on a major project due to its "perceived high-risk", which had been underway for two years. The company, citing "the current risk averse publishing climate", concluded that its goal of exploring new territory was not possible. In a press release, Hassabis said: "It seems that today's games industry no longer has room for small independent developers wanting to work on innovative and original ideas. ... [T]his was the sole purpose of setting up Elixir and something we could never compromise on." Elixir stated that it had sufficient resources to pay redundancy packages to its staff and ensure that the company was wound down in an orderly manner.

Rebellion Developments bought Elixir's intellectual property in March 2006, including Evil Genius.

Games

References

Defunct video game companies of the United Kingdom
Video game development companies
Video game companies established in 1998
Video game companies disestablished in 2005
Defunct companies based in London
1998 establishments in England
2005 disestablishments in England